Fort Recovery High School is a public high school in the Fort Recovery School District, and is located in Fort Recovery, Ohio.  Their nickname is the Indians.  They are a member of the Midwest Athletic Conference.

Varsity sports
Fall sports:
 American football D6
 Volleyball D3
 Boys' golf
 Girls' golf
 Boys' cross-country D3
 Girls' cross-country D3
Winter sports:
 Boys' basketball D4
 Girls' basketball D3
 Boys' swimming D2
 Girls' swimming D2
Spring sports:
 Baseball D4
 Softball D3
 Boys' track and field D3
 Girls' track and field D3

Ohio High School Athletic Association state championships

 Boys' football- 2015
 Boys' basketball - 1971
 Girls' basketball - 1990,1991
 Girls' volleyball – 1990
 Boys' cross-country – 1996

External links
 District website

Notes and references

High schools in Mercer County, Ohio
Public high schools in Ohio